The governor of Camiguin, is the chief executive of the provincial government of Camiguin.

Provincial Governors (1987-2025)

References

Governors of Camiguin
Camiguin